Blood Relations or Blood Relation may refer to:

 Blood Relations (Pollock play), a play by Sharon Pollock, based on the life of Lizzie Borden
Blood Relations (Malouf play), a 1987 play by David Malouf
 Blood Relations: Chosen Families in Buffy the Vampire Slayer and Angel, an academic book analyzing the two television series
Blood Relations (film), a 1988 Canadian horror film
 Blood Relation (film), a 1963 South Korean film
 "Blood Relation" (Medium), an episode from season three of the American television series, Medium
An episode of Criminal Minds

See also
Blood relationship, for consanguinity and kinship
 Blood Ties (disambiguation)